Glade Creek is a major tributary of the New River in Raleigh County, West Virginia.  Glade Creek lies within the largest side valley off New River in the New River Gorge National River area.

Sources
Glade Creek is formed on Flat Top Mountain just north of the point where Raleigh, Summers and Mercer counties intersect.  Just north of its source near Ghent, it is impounded to form Flat Top Lake.  Further north, it is again impounded to form Glade Creek Reservoir.

Canyon
Immediately north of Glade Creek Reservoir, Glade Creek begins its canyon section.

Much of the lower canyon is traversed by an abandoned railroad bed.  Today, this former railbed is now maintained as a hiking trail by New River Gorge National River.

Phil G. McDonald Bridge

See also
List of rivers of West Virginia

References

Rivers of West Virginia
New River Gorge National Park and Preserve
Rivers of Raleigh County, West Virginia